Buffalo Elementary School of Technology (formerly P.S. 6 and later Academic Challenge Center) is an elementary school located in Buffalo, New York. It is located at 414 South Division Street in Buffalo and serves Grades K through 8.  the acting principal is  Karen Piotrowski. The previous principal, Sharon Brown, was transferred.

History 
The school was established in 1839 as P.S. 6. In 1977 the school became one of the first magnet schools in the city and was renamed the "Academic Challenge Center." In 1997 the school was renamed "Buffalo Elementary School of Technology" in response to the school adopting a program that would integrate technology use into all subject areas.

Former principals 
Previous assignment and reason for departure denoted in parentheses
Mary Caldwell
S.G. Love
Ephraim F. Cook
Samuel Slade
Henry H. Rogers
William D. Fisher
Thomas W. Connors
Gordon H. Higgins
Philip W. Patti
David M. Hansen
Jane Cunningham
Paul Lafornara
Edith James
Marion Canedo–?-1991
Bernice T. Richardson–1991-1995 (Director - Liberty Partnership Program at Buffalo State College, placed on leave)
Nathaniel McCrea–1995-2007 (Assistant Principal - Frederick Law Olmsted 64, placed on assignment)
Debra Sellivan-Pores–2007-2011 (Assistant Principal - International School 45, named Principal of West Hertel Academy)
Sharon Brown–2011-2014 (Principal - West Hertel Academy, named Principal of D'Youville Porter Campus School)

References 

Magnet schools in New York (state)
Public middle schools in New York (state)
Public elementary schools in New York (state)
Schools in Buffalo, New York